Juan Alberto Mosquera Álvarez (born 10 February 1996), is a Colombian professional footballer who plays for as a midfielder for Bucaramanga.

Career
Juan Mosquera was born in Turbo, Colombia. On 21 January 2020, he signed with Portuguese club Marítimo.

References

External links

1996 births
Living people
Colombian footballers
Association football midfielders
Categoría Primera A players
Primeira Liga players
Envigado F.C. players
C.S. Marítimo players
Atlético Bucaramanga footballers
Colombian expatriate footballers
Colombian expatriate sportspeople in Portugal
Expatriate footballers in Portugal
Sportspeople from Antioquia Department